Robinson Eduardo Chalapud Gómez (born 8 March 1984) is a Colombian racing cyclist, who currently rides for UCI Continental team . He competed in the 2014 Giro d'Italia and won the 2015 Colombian National Road Race Championships.

Major results

2006
 4th Overall Vuelta a Guatemala
2010
 7th Overall Circuito Montañés
2011
 5th Overall Tour de l'Ain
 6th GP Miguel Induráin
 8th Klasika Primavera
 10th Prueba Villafranca de Ordizia
2014
 10th Coppa Sabatini
2015
 1st  Road race, National Road Championships
 3rd Overall Joe Martin Stage Race
 6th Overall Tour of the Gila
2018
 4th Overall Vuelta a Asturias
2019
 1st  Overall Tour of Qinghai Lake
1st Stage 1 (TTT)
 1st  Overall Vuelta a la Independencia Nacional
1st Stage 1
2021
 1st Stage 7 Vuelta a Colombia
2022
 1st Stage 1 Vuelta a Guatemala
 8th Overall Vuelta a Colombia
1st Stage 9

Grand Tour general classification results timeline

References

External links
 

1984 births
Living people
Colombian male cyclists
Sportspeople from Nariño Department
21st-century Colombian people